Finger on the Trigger (also known as Blue Lightning) is a 1965 Western film directed by Sidney W. Pink and starring Rory Calhoun. It was distributed on VHS by Troma Entertainment.

At the end of the American Civil War, a group of discharged federal troops travel west to California to settle the free land offered by the US Government to honorably discharged veterans. These veterans clash with a band of renegade Confederates in a deserted town in Oklahoma.

Plot

Cast

Production
The film was meant to star Victor Mature but he pulled out. Pink later sued Mature.

References

External links

1965 films
1965 Western (genre) films
American independent films
Troma Entertainment films
American Western (genre) films
Spanish independent films
Spanish Western (genre) films
Allied Artists films
Films shot in Almería
Films directed by Sidney W. Pink
Films produced by Sidney W. Pink
1965 independent films
English-language Spanish films
1960s English-language films
1960s American films